Felipe de Jesús Vicencio Álvarez (26 December 1959 – 12 October 2012) was a Mexican politician affiliated with the National Action Party. He served as Senator of the LVIII and LIX Legislatures of the Mexican Congress representing Jalisco and as Deputy of the LVII Legislature.

References

1959 births
2012 deaths
People from Mexico City
Members of the Senate of the Republic (Mexico)
Members of the Chamber of Deputies (Mexico)
National Action Party (Mexico) politicians
Deaths from cancer in Mexico
21st-century Mexican politicians